Moriani is a surname. Notable persons with that name include:

 Giuseppe Moriani (17th–18th century), Italian painter
 Napoleone Moriani (1808–1878), Italian opera singer

See also
 San-Giovanni-di-Moriani, a commune on the island of Corsica
 Santa-Reparata-di-Moriani, a commune on the island of Corsica

Italian-language surnames